Logan Daniel Ryan (born February 9, 1991) is an American football strong safety for the Tampa Bay Buccaneers of the National Football League (NFL). He played college football at Rutgers as a cornerback and was drafted by the New England Patriots in the third round of the 2013 NFL Draft. He has also played for the Tennessee Titans and New York Giants.

Early years
A native of Berlin, New Jersey, Ryan attended Eastern Regional High School in Voorhees, New Jersey, and played for the Eastern Vikings high school football team. He was an all-state selection at both cornerback and quarterback. Regarded as a four-star recruit by Rivals.com, Ryan was ranked the No. 32 cornerback prospect in his class.

College career
Ryan played for the Rutgers Scarlet Knights football team from 2009 to 2012. He was a second-team All-Big East Conference selection as a sophomore in 2011 and was a first-team All-Big East selection as a junior in 2012.

Ryan was also named a first-team All-American by Pro Football Weekly in 2012.

On December 31, 2012, Ryan announced that he would forgo his senior year at Rutgers and declared for the 2013 NFL Draft.

Professional career
Coming out of Rutgers, Ryan was projected to be a third round by the majority of NFL draft experts and scouts. He attended the NFL combine and completed all of the required combine and positional drills. On March 13, 2013, Ryan participated at Rutgers' pro day along with Marcus Cooper, Duron Harmon, Steve Beauharnais, Mark Harrison, Brandon Jones, Jawan Jamison, Khaseem Greene, and seven others. NFLDraftScout.com ranked him the 13th best cornerback prospect in the draft.

New England Patriots
The New England Patriots selected Ryan in the third round (83rd overall) of the 2013 NFL Draft. He was the 14th cornerback drafted in 2013.

2013 season
On May 16, 2013, the New England Patriots signed Ryan to a four-year, $2.77 million contract that includes a signing bonus of $563,252.

Ryan competed for a starting cornerback job behind Alfonzo Dennard, Aqib Talib, Kyle Arrington, and Ras-I Dowling. Head coach Bill Belichick named him the fourth cornerback on the Patriots' depth chart to begin the 2013 season, behind Dennard, Talib, and Arrington.

Ryan made his NFL debut in the Patriots' season-opening 23–21 victory over the Buffalo Bills. During Week 6 against the New Orleans Saints, Ryan made his first NFL start, helping the Patriots earn a 30–27 victory. On October 20, 2013, Ryan made four solo tackles, a pass deflection, and his first NFL interception off a pass from New York Jets quarterback Geno Smith during a 27–30 loss. He returned the interception for a 79-yard touchdown, marking the first of his career. The following week, he recorded a season-high four solo tackles, defended a pass, forced a fumble, and was credited with the first 1 sacks of his career after taking down Ryan Tannehill in a 27–17 victory over the Miami Dolphins.

On November 24, 2013, Ryan was named the starter over Alfonzo Dennard, who had been battling a knee injury. He recorded four combined tackles, a pass deflection, and intercepted a pass by Peyton Manning during a 34–31 victory over the Denver Broncos. The following week, he started in place of Dennard, who was inactive, and recorded three solo tackles, two pass deflections, and intercepted a pass attempt by Case Keenum during the Patriots' 34–31 victory over the Houston Texans. On December 22, 2013, he recorded a tackle, a season-high two pass deflections, and intercepted Joe Flacco twice, as the Patriots defeated the Baltimore Ravens 41–7.

Ryan finished his rookie year with 35 combined tackles (29 solo), 1.5 sacks, five interceptions, ten passes defended, and a forced fumble in 16 games and seven starts.

2014 season

Ryan competed against Alfonzo Dennard, Darrelle Revis, Kyle Arrington, and Brandon Browner for the vacant starting cornerback position left by the departure of Aqib Talib. He was named the third cornerback on the Patriots' depth chart to begin the regular season.

On September 14, 2014, Ryan earned his first start of the season after Dennard was unable to play due to a shoulder injury. Ryan recorded three combined tackles, defended two passes, and intercepted Teddy Bridgewater during a 30–7 victory over the Minnesota Vikings. In the next game, he recorded a season-high four solo tackles and deflected a pass during a 16–9 win against the Oakland Raiders. In the regular-season finale, Ryan collected a season-high five combined tackles during a 9–17 loss to the Buffalo Bills. He was named the starter after Alfonzo Dennard suffered a hamstring injury earlier in the week.

Ryan finished his second professional season with 42 combined tackles (29 solo), six pass deflections, and two interceptions in 16 games and six starts.

The Patriots finished the season atop the AFC East with a 12–4 record. On January 10, 2015, Ryan played in his first career playoff game and made one tackle and forced a fumble in a 35–31 victory over the Baltimore Ravens. On February 1, 2015, Ryan appeared in Super Bowl XLIX and made a tackle and pass deflection in a 28–24 victory over the Seattle Seahawks.

2015 season
Ryan competed with Malcolm Butler, Justin Green, Bradley Fletcher, and Tarell Brown for the vacant starting cornerback positions throughout training camp after Darrelle Revis, Alfonzo Dennard, Kyle Arrington, and Brandon Browner left during the off season. Head coach Bill Belichick named him the third cornerback on the depth chart behind Malcolm Butler and Tarell Brown to start the  season.

During Week 2 against the Buffalo Bills, Ryan recorded four combined tackles, deflected a pass, and intercepted a pass attempt by Tyrod Taylor as the Patriots won 40–32. The following week, he was named the starting cornerback after Tarell Brown was unable to play due to a foot injury. Ryan made four combined tackles during the 51–17 win against the Jacksonville Jaguars. During Week 5 against the Dallas Cowboys, Ryan recorded three combined tackles, a pass deflection, and intercepted a pass attempt by quarterback Brandon Weeden during a 30–6 road victory. In the next game, he recorded a season-high nine combined tackles and defended the pass during a 34–27 victory over the Indianapolis Colts. He was named the indefinite starting cornerback for the remainder of the season after the game, replacing Tarell Brown who was placed on injured reserve.

Ryan finished the 2015 season with 74 combined tackles (58 solo), a then career-high 14 pass deflections, and four interceptions in 16 games and 14 starts.

The Patriots finished atop the AFC East with a 12–4 record and earned a playoff berth. On January 16, 2016, he made his first NFL postseason start and recorded nine combined tackles during a 27–20 victory over the Kansas City Chiefs. The following week, he made five solo tackles and defended a pass, as the Patriots lost on the road 18–20 to the Denver Broncos in the AFC Championship.

2016 season
Ryan was named the starting cornerback, alongside Malcolm Butler, for the second consecutive season.

On October 2, 2016, Ryan recorded a career-high 17 combined tackles in the Patriots' 0–16 loss to the Buffalo Bills. Ryan was delegated to the third cornerback on the depth chart for Weeks 7-8 after Eric Rowe emerged as the starter after being inactive for the first five games while rehabbing an ankle injury. During Week 11, Ryan was moved to starting nickelback after struggling against receivers as the starting outside cornerback. Rowe replaced starting outside cornerback as Ryan took over slot coverage duties from Patrick Chung. He developed into a viable starting nickelback and gave up only four receptions on 11 targets through Weeks 11-12. Through Weeks 11-16, he was called for one penalty and allowed no touchdown receptions and only 11 catches on 30 pass attempts.

On December 18, 2016, Ryan recorded seven solo tackles, deflected a pass, and intercepted quarterback Trevor Siemian as the Patriots defeated the Denver Broncos on the road by a score of 16–3. In the regular-season finale, Ryan made seven combined tackles, defended a pass, and intercepted Ryan Tannehill during a 35–14 victory over the Miami Dolphins.

Ryan finished the season with a then-career-high 92 combined tackles (74 solo), 11 pass deflections, two interceptions, a sack, and a forced fumble while appearing in all 16 games and starting 13. He started six games as the outside cornerback with Malcolm Butler and started seven games as nickelback.

The Patriots finished atop the AFC East with a 14–2 record. On January 14, 2017, he started at nickelback in the Divisional Round of the playoffs against the Houston Texans and collected seven combined tackles, three pass deflections, a sack, and intercepted a pass attempt by quarterback Brock Osweiler in the 34–16 victory. On February 5, 2017, Ryan started in the Super Bowl LI — the first Super Bowl start of his career — and recorded six combined tackles as the Patriots defeated the Atlanta Falcons 34–28 in overtime after trailing by 25 points in the third quarter.

Tennessee Titans
On March 10, 2017, the Tennessee Titans signed Ryan to a three-year, $30 million contract with $12 million guaranteed and a signing bonus of $2 million.

2017 season
Ryan was named the Titans' starting cornerback, opposite Adoree' Jackson, to begin the regular season. Ryan made his Titans' debut in the season-opener against the Oakland Raiders and recorded a tackle and forced a fumble during a 16–26 loss. Two weeks later, he earned a season-high six solo tackles and a season-high three pass deflections, as the Titans defeated the Seattle Seahawks 33–27.

Ryan finished his first season with the Titans with 62 tackles, a forced fumble, and 11 pass deflections.

The Titans finished second in the AFC South with a 9–7 record and qualified for the playoffs. In the Wild Card Round, the Titans played the Kansas City Chiefs. In a 22–21 road victory, Ryan had three solo tackles. In the Divisional Round against the New England Patriots, he had 12 tackles (10 solo) in the 35–14 road loss.

2018 season

Ryan entered the 2018 season as a starting cornerback alongside Adoree' Jackson and former Patriots teammate Malcolm Butler. He started the first 14 games before suffering a broken fibula in a Week 15 17–0 road victory against the New York Giants. He was placed on injured reserve on December 18, 2018.

Ryan finished the season with 76 tackles, eight passes defensed, no interceptions, and a career-high four sacks, which led all defensive backs at the time of his injury.

2019 season
Ryan returned from his injury in time for the Titans' season opener against the Cleveland Browns. In that game, he made eight tackles, sacked Baker Mayfield 1.5 times, and intercepted a pass from him once as the Titans won 43–13. In the next game against the Indianapolis Colts, he intercepted former Patriots teammate Jacoby Brissett once as the Titans narrowly lost 19–17. During Week 5 against the Buffalo Bills, Ryan recorded a team high nine tackles and sacked Josh Allen once in the 14–7 loss. During Week 10 against the Kansas City Chiefs, he recorded a team high 13 tackles and three passes defended in the narrow 35–32 victory.

Ryan finished the season setting career-highs in tackles with 113, sacks with 4.5, pass deflections with 18, and forced fumbles with four. He also had four interceptions.

On January 4, 2020, the Titans played in the Wild Card Round of the playoffs where they faced Ryan's former team, the New England Patriots. In the waning seconds of the game with the Titans leading 14–13, and New England on their own 1-yard line, Ryan intercepted a deflected pass from former teammate Tom Brady (which turned out to be Brady's final pass as a Patriot, as he would not return to the Patriots the following season) and returned it for a 9-yard touchdown. The score secured a 20–13 upset in Foxborough, allowing the Titans to play in the Divisional Round of the playoffs for the second time in three years. In the Divisional Round against the Baltimore Ravens, Ryan recorded a team-high 13 tackles during the 28–12 road victory.

New York Giants

2020 season
On September 5, 2020, Ryan signed a one-year, $7.5 million contract with the New York Giants. This was the first season, Ryan chose to switch positions from cornerback to safety.

In Week 5 against the Dallas Cowboys, Ryan recorded a tackle on quarterback Dak Prescott that caused Prescott's right ankle to compound fracture and dislocate.

In Week 9 against the Washington Football Team, one day after his wife suffered an ectopic pregnancy, Ryan recorded his first interception of the season off quarterback Alex Smith with less than two minutes in the 4th quarter to secure a 23–20 Giants' win.

On December 25, 2020, Ryan signed a three-year, $31 million contract extension with $20 million guaranteed.

2021 season

On November 20, 2021, Ryan was placed on the reserve/COVID-19 list ruling him out for Week 11 and Week 12 games against the Tampa Bay Buccaneers and the Philadelphia Eagles. On November 30, 2021, Ryan was activated off of the reserve/COVID-19 list.

The Giants released Ryan on March 17, 2022.

Tampa Bay Buccaneers
On March 24, 2022, Ryan signed with the Tampa Bay Buccaneers. He suffered a foot injury in Week 4 and was placed on injured reserve on October 18. He was activated on December 5.

NFL career statistics

Regular season

Postseason

Personal life
Ryan and his wife, Ashley, have two kids, Avery and Otto, and are the founders of The Ryan Animal Rescue Foundation (RARF.org). RARF works with animal welfare organizations to promote adoption and provide grants and educational opportunities. Every month on the 26th—the day corresponding to his jersey number—Ryan posts a photo on social media with a dog that is in need of adoption along with the hashtag #ryansmonthlyrescue. Ryan's older brother, Jordan, attended Drexel University and is now an engineer.

Ryan's wife needed emergency surgery during November 2020, due to trouble with her pregnancy.

References

External links
Rutgers Scarlet Knights bio
New England Patriots bio
Tennessee Titans bio

1991 births
African-American players of American football
All-American college football players
American football cornerbacks
American football safeties
Eastern Regional High School alumni
Living people
New England Patriots players
New York Giants players
People from Berlin, New Jersey
Players of American football from New Jersey
Rutgers Scarlet Knights football players
Sportspeople from Camden County, New Jersey
Tennessee Titans players
21st-century African-American sportspeople
Tampa Bay Buccaneers players